Helmut Köglberger (12 January 1946 – 23 September 2018) was an Austrian professional footballer who played as a striker. He represented the Austria national football team.

Köglberger was the Austrian league top scorer in 1968/69 and 1974/75.

Early life
Köglberger was born on 12 January 1946 in Steyr to an African American father and Austrian mother.

References

External links
 
 

1946 births
2018 deaths
People from Steyr
Austrian footballers
Austrian football managers
Austria international footballers
Austrian people of African-American descent
FK Austria Wien players
LASK players
Austrian Football Bundesliga players
Association football forwards
Footballers from Upper Austria